

The Drift is a collaborative EP by producer-composer Arjun Singh and musician Michelle Chamuel. Released in January 2014, the EP is a collection of six original songs and was in the works for about a year. The fifth track "Drift" features vocals by hip hop artist Isaac Castor in a duet with Chamuel. The second track "Not Now" had been released as a single in November 2013. The EP peaked at number 2 on the iTunes Electronic albums chart in 2014.

Track listing

Personnel 
Partially adapted from Michigan Radio.
 Michelle Chamuel – composer, performer, producer, vocals
 Arjun Singh – composer, performer, producer
 Isaac Castor – vocals (track 5)
 Chris Dupont – guitar (track 5)
 Nick Nagurka – mixing, editing
 Tyler Duncan – mixing, editing
 Brian Cabanatuan – mixing
 Chris Gehringer – mastering

References

2014 EPs
Michelle Chamuel EPs